Edgar D. Bush (February 3, 1873 – July 21, 1949) was a politician from the U.S. state of Indiana. Between 1917 and 1921 and again from 1929 through 1933 he served as Lieutenant Governor of Indiana.

Life
Edgar Bush was born in Washington County, Indiana. Bush moved with his parents to Salem, Indiana and went to the public schools. In 1895, Bush graduated from Indiana University. He was a high school principal for the North Anderson Township High School in Anderson, Indiana. Bush was involved in the bonding business. He joined the Republican Party and in 1916 he was elected to the office of the Lieutenant Governor of Indiana. He served in this position between 8 January 1917 and 10 January 1921 when his term ended. In this function he was the deputy of Governor James P. Goodrich and he presided over the Indiana Senate. Between 14 January 1929 and 9 January 1933 he held the same offices again under Governor Harry G. Leslie.

Edgar Bush died on July 21, 1949, in New Albany, Indiana.

References

External links
The Political Graveyard

1873 births
1949 deaths
People from Washington County, Indiana
Indiana University Bloomington alumni
Businesspeople from Indiana
Educators from Indiana
Lieutenant Governors of Indiana
Indiana Republicans